2nd Grade is an American indie rock band from Philadelphia, Pennsylvania. The group has released two full-length albums.

History
2nd Grade began as the project of musician Peter Gill. In 2018, Gill released a demo titled Wish You Were Here Tour. After the demo, the project expanded, and added Jon Samuels of Friendship and Catherine Dwyer and Jack Washburn of Remember Sports. With this expansion, the group released their first album together, Hit to Hit, in 2021 through Double Double Whammy. The album was named Stereogum's "Album Of The Week". The group announced their second album in mid-2022. The album, titled Easy Listening, was released on September 30, 2022.

References

Musical groups from Philadelphia